Dr. Chi is an album by trumpeter Woody Shaw and the Tone Janša Quartet which was recorded in Slovenia in 1986 and released on the Timeless label.

Reception

Steve Loewy of Allmusic stated, "this delightful collaboration between American trumpeter Woody Shaw and the Tone Janša Quartet works on nearly every level... Janša's fluid, driving lines fit beautifully with Shaw's concepts. Even more importantly, Shaw is in great form, and there is an electricity in the air that infuses each track... A strong addition to Shaw's and Janša's discographies, and a good introduction to the saxophonist's work".

Track listing 
All compositions by Tone Janša except as indicated
 "Dr. Chi" (Woody Shaw) - 15:19
 "Odra" - 8:04
 "Stroll and Flight" - 12:33
 "Nostalgia" - 3:48
 "Chain" - 8:48
 "Zoltan" (Shaw) - 8:32

Personnel 
Woody Shaw - trumpet, flugelhorn
Tone Janša - tenor saxophone, soprano saxophone
Renato Chicco - piano 
Peter Herbert - bass
Alexander Deutsch - drums

References 

Woody Shaw albums
1989 albums
Timeless Records albums